Axel Müller (born 24 July 1963) is a German judge and politician of the Christian Democratic Union (CDU) who has been serving as a member of the Bundestag from the state of Baden-Württemberg since 2017. He represents Ravensburg.

Political career 
Müller became member of the Bundestag after the 2017 German federal election. In parliament, he is a member of the Committee on European Union Affairs; the Committee on Legal Affairs and Consumer Protection; the Committee on Internal Affairs; and the Committee for the Scrutiny of Acoustic Surveillance of the Private Home.

References

External links 

  
 Bundestag biography 

1963 births
Living people
Members of the Bundestag for Baden-Württemberg
Members of the Bundestag 2017–2021
Members of the Bundestag 2021–2025
Members of the Bundestag for the Christian Democratic Union of Germany